Jay Paul Deratany is an American lawyer and filmmaker. He is the founder of Deratany & Kosner in Chicago and focuses his practice on human rights issues. He is the writer and producer of the feature film Foster Boy as well as the play Haram! Iran!.

Biography

Deratany was born in Detroit, Michigan and obtained his J.D. degree from DePaul University College of Law. He founded The Deratany Firm, a law firm based in Chicago. Practicing law he has won numerous human rights advocate cases including the largest jury verdict in Lake County history.

Deratany is also a filmmaker, having received a Master of Fine Arts from the University of California, Riverside. He has written such films as Foster Boy and Saugatuck Cures. Foster Boy is based on actual cases he worked as an attorney and won numerous awards at national film festivals. He is the author of the play Haram! Iran! which is based on the story of Mahmoud Asgari and Ayaz Marhoni who were put to death in Iran for an alleged homosexual encounter.

He is also the co-author of the book Lincoln's Dilemma.

Filmography

Film

Theatre

Personal life

Deratany has been involved with numerous causes, mainly focused on helping foster children. He was also inducted into the Chicago LGBT Hall of Fame for his work with LGBT youth and filmmaking.

References

External links
 Deratany & Kosner law firm
 Jay Paul Deratany on IMDb

Year of birth missing (living people)
Living people
American lawyers
American filmmakers
Inductees of the Chicago LGBT Hall of Fame